The Sir Brian Urquhart Award is given annually by the United Nations Association – UK for distinguished service to the United Nations. The award celebrates Urquhart’s work on behalf of the UN, and is presented to individuals whose own efforts reflect his contribution.

Urquhart was the second person recruited to the UN Secretariat in 1945 and worked with the Executive Committee of the Preparatory Commission of the United Nations to establish the administrative framework of the organisation that had been created by the U.N. Charter. Having served at the United Nations for four decades, Urquhart undertook the direction of peacekeeping operations, in the Middle East, Cyprus, Kashmir, Lebanon and the Congo. Urquhart retired in 1986 at the rank of Under-Secretary-General. He is currently a member of UNA-UK's expert advisory panel.

Recipients
Past recipients of the award include:
 2011: Dame Margaret Anstee
 2012: Sir Richard Jolly
 2013: Ian Martin
 2014: Lynn Davies
 2015: Lord Hannay of Chiswick
 2016: Christine Chinkin
 2017: Lord Judd of Portsea
 2018: Purna Sen
 2019: Andrew Gilmour
 2020: Zeinab Badawi
 2021: isreen Elsaim and Maria Fernanda Espinosa

References

Awards established in 2011